The 2005–06 season was Futbol Club Barcelona's 107th season in existence and 77th consecutive season in the top flight of Spanish football, La Liga. It was manager Frank Rijkaard's third season in charge of the club, a season in which he managed to successfully retain the La Liga title, as well as winning the UEFA Champions League and Spanish Super Cup. The squad was largely unchanged from the previous season, with only two players – Santiago Ezquerro and Mark van Bommel – joining the club. Gerard left on a free transfer during the summer.

Samuel Eto'o was once again the top scorer for the team, improving on his tally of 29 goals from the 2004–05 season by five goals, including one in the Champions League final. Ronaldinho and Eto'o were selected in the 2005–06 FIFPro XI at the end of the season.

Squad
Squad at end of season

Coaching staff

Transfers

In

Total spending:  €0

Out

Total income:  €10,000,000
{|

Competitions

Supercopa

La Liga

League table

Results by round

Matches

Copa del Rey

Round of 16

Quarter-finals

Champions League

Group stage

Group C

Knockout stage

Round Of 16

Quarter-finals

Semi-finals

Final

Friendlies

Statistics

Start formations

Players statistics

Notes

References

External links
 
 FCBarcelonaweb.co.uk English Speaking FC Barcelona Supporters
 ESPNsoccernet: Barcelona Team Page 
 FC Barcelona (Spain) profile
 uefa.com - UEFA Champions League
 Web Oficial de la Liga de Fútbol Profesional
 
 

FC Barcelona seasons
Barcelona
UEFA Champions League-winning seasons
Spanish football championship-winning seasons